FC Angara Angarsk was a Russian football team from Angarsk. It played professionally in 1963–1973, 1976–1985 and 1990–1997. Their best result was 1st place in Zone 7 of the Russian Second Division in 1993 (due to reorganization of the Russian football league pyramid in 1994 they did not advance to the higher level).

Team name history
 1963–1975: FC Start Angarsk
 1976–1991: FC Angara Angarsk
 1992: FC Aleks Angarsk
 1993–2003: FC Angara Angarsk

External links
  Team history at KLISF

Association football clubs established in 1963
Association football clubs disestablished in 2004
Defunct football clubs in Russia
Sport in Irkutsk Oblast
1963 establishments in Russia
2004 disestablishments in Russia